Määri is a village in Väike-Maarja Parish, Lääne-Viru County, in northeastern Estonia.

Werner Zoege von Manteuffel, surgeon and advisor to Russian emperor Nicholas II,  (1857–1926) was born in Määri Manor.

References

 

Villages in Lääne-Viru County